Delta Force: Xtreme is a budget first-person shooter video game developed and published by NovaLogic for Microsoft Windows.

It is the seventh title (excluding console titles) of the series. As a budget title, it reuses levels from previous Delta Force titles.

The game is centered on three campaigns, focusing on preventing drug shipments in Peru, to eliminating terrorist threats in Chad and Novoya Zemlya.

Gameplay

Delta Force: Xtreme focuses on three campaigns from Delta Force: Peru, Chad, and Novaya Zemlya. The game's Single Player (unlike previous titles), introduces vehicular combat, but mostly on-foot combat to keep the balance. The game also features the "old style" scope that was present in the first four Delta Force titles. Gametypes (Deathmatch, Team Deathmatch, King of the Hill, etc.) from the original Delta Force have also been brought back.

Reception 

Delta Force: Xtreme received "mixed" reviews according to video game review aggregator Metacritic.

See also 
 Delta Force: Xtreme 2

References

External links 
Delta Force Xtreme Homepage

2005 video games
Delta Force (video game series)
First-person shooters
Tactical shooter video games
Video games about Delta Force
Video games developed in the United States
Video games set in Peru
Video games set in Chad
Video games set in Russia
Windows games
Windows-only games
NovaLogic games